The 2022 Kansas Lottery 150 was the 17th stock car race of the 2022 ARCA Menards Series season, and the 22nd iteration of the event. The race was scheduled to held on Saturday, September 10, 2022, but due to inclement weather, the race would later be held on Sunday, September 11. in Kansas City, Kansas at Kansas Speedway, a 1.5-mile (2.4 km) permanent tri-oval shaped racetrack. The race was increased from 100 laps to 105 laps, due to a NASCAR overtime finish. Corey Heim, driving for Venturini Motorsports, put on a dominating performance, leading nearly every lap for his ninth career ARCA Menards Series win, and his second of the season. To fill out the podium, Nick Sanchez, driving for Rev Racing, and Sammy Smith, driving for Kyle Busch Motorsports, would finish 2nd and 3rd, respectively.

Background 
Kansas Speedway is a  tri-oval race track in the Village West area near Kansas City, Kansas, United States. It was built in 2001 and it currently hosts two annual NASCAR race weekends. The IndyCar Series also held races at the venue until 2011. The speedway is owned and operated by NASCAR.

Entry list 

 (R) denotes rookie driver

Practice 
The only 35-minute practice session was held on Saturday, September 10, at 9:15 am CST.

Qualifying 
Qualifying was held on Saturday, September 10, at 10:00 am CST. The qualifying system used is a multiple-car, multiple-lap system with only one round. Whoever sets the fastest time in the round wins the pole.

Race results

Standings after the race 

Drivers' Championship standings

Note: Only the first 10 positions are included for the driver standings.

References

External links 

2022 ARCA Menards Series
Kansas Lottery 150
2022 in sports in Kansas